Vodka Lemon is a 2003 internationally co-produced comedy-drama film directed by the Iraqi–Kurdish director Huner Saleem.

Plot
The film is set in a Yazidi village in Armenia, still suffering economically from the Soviet Union's collapse. Hamo, a widower with three sons, visits his wife's grave every day. In the graveyard, he meets Nina, a widow who works at a local roadside stand called Vodka Lemon which is about to close down. Both are penniless, yet start an unexpected relationship which revitalises them.

Awards
San Marco Prize, Best Film Award, 60th Venice International Film Festival, 2003.
Jury Award, Feature Film/Best Actor, Newport Beach Film Festival, 2004.
Grand Prize, Jury Prize and Best Photography, Mons International Festival of Love Films, 2004.
Best Film 2003 nominee - Bangkok Film Festival, 2004

Cast
Romen Avinian
Lala Sarkissian
Gagik Sargsyan
Ruzan Mesropyan
Zahal Karielachvili
Armen Marutyan
Astrik Avaguian
Ivan Franěk

Soundtrack
 Tombe la neige by Salvatore Adamo
 Письмо (Pismo / Letter) by Klavdiya Shulzhenko

External links

 

2003 films
2003 comedy-drama films
Armenian comedy-drama films
Italian comedy-drama films
Swiss comedy-drama films
French comedy-drama films
Kurdish-language films
Armenian-language films
2000s Russian-language films
2000s French-language films
Films set in Armenia